7th CFCA Awards

Best Film: 
 Hoop Dreams 
The 7th Chicago Film Critics Association Awards honored the finest achievements in 1994 filmmaking.

Winners
 Best Actor: 
 Tom Hanks - Forrest Gump
 Best Actress: 
 Jennifer Jason Leigh - Mrs. Parker and the Vicious Circle
 Best Director: 
 Quentin Tarantino - Pulp Fiction
 Best Film: 
 Hoop Dreams
 Best Foreign Language Film: 
 Trois couleurs: Rouge (Red), Poland/France/Switzerland
 Best Score:
 "The Lion King" - Hans Zimmer
 Best Screenplay: 
 Pulp Fiction - Roger Avary and Quentin Tarantino
 Best Supporting Actor: 
 Martin Landau - Ed Wood
 Best Supporting Actress: 
 Dianne Wiest - Bullets over Broadway
 Most Promising Actor: 
 Hugh Grant - Four Weddings and a Funeral
 Most Promising Actress: 
 Kirsten Dunst - Interview with the Vampire

References
http://www.chicagofilmcritics.org/index.php?option=com_content&view=article&id=49&Itemid=59

 1994
1994 film awards